This is a list of states in the Holy Roman Empire beginning with the letter R:

References

R